Börjesson is a surname. Notable people with the surname include:

Agnes Börjesson (1827–1900), Swedish painter
Agneta Börjesson (born 1957), Swedish politician
Bengt Börjesson (1920–1977), Swedish politician
Dick Börjesson (born 1938), Swedish vice admiral
Erik Börjesson (1886–1983), Swedish football striker
Josef Börjesson (1891–1971), Swedish amateur football player
Rune Börjesson (1937-1996), Swedish international football player
Kristina Borjesson, American freelance journalist

Swedish-language surnames